Brian Shaw (born 1966) is an American basketball coach and former player.

Brian or Bryan Shaw may also refer to:

Sports
 Bryan Shaw (baseball) (born 1987), American baseball player
 Brian Shaw (ice hockey, born 1962), Canadian ice hockey player
 Brian C. Shaw (1930–1993), Canadian ice hockey coach
 Brian Shaw (rugby league) (1931–2011), English rugby league footballer
 Brian Shaw (strongman) (born 1982), American strongman competitor

Others
 Brian Shaw (dancer) (1919–1992), British ballet dancer
 Bryan Shaw (chemist) (born 1976), American chemist
 Brian Duncan Shaw (1898–1999), British chemistry lecturer
 Brian Shaw (shipping executive) (1933–2011), chairman of the International Chamber of Shipping